Statistics of American Soccer League II in season 1934–35.

Metropolitan Division

New England Division

First half

Second half

As in the previous season, the second half of the New England Division's season was truncated due to the league's teams taking part in the National Challenge Cup during the first three months of the year. The second half finally started on the last day of March but only lasted a month before fading out at the end of April. The league season was technically still open during May but no games were played in large part due to Pawtucket's drive to become the National Challenge Cup champions.

Playoff
At the end of May, and with little fanfare, a playoff between the first and second half winners was held to determine the championship of the New England Division.

References

American Soccer League (1933–1983) seasons
American Soccer League, 1934–35